Matthew Kirk Weibring (born December 4, 1979) is an American professional golfer. He is the son of D. A. Weibring.

Weibring turned professional in 2002, and played on the second-tier Nationwide Tour in 2003 and 2005–08. He played on the PGA Tour in 2009–10 after graduating in 24th place from the 2008 Nationwide Tour. In 2011 he returned to the Nationwide Tour. Weibring's best result on the PGA Tour is T8 at the 2009 Verizon Heritage. He also played on the Canadian Tour in 2003.

Weibring has a history of injuries, include hip and knee surgery. He has Bell's palsy, a condition his father overcame during his career, and cannot blink his right eye.

See also
2008 Nationwide Tour graduates

References

External links

American male golfers
Georgia Tech Yellow Jackets men's golfers
PGA Tour golfers
Korn Ferry Tour graduates
Golfers from Dallas
1979 births
Living people